The copyright law of Brazil is primarily based on Law Nº9,610 from 19 February 1998. Additionally, Brazil has signed the Berne Convention and the TRIPS Agreement.

History

Imperial period 
Brazil's first constitution, the Imperial Constitution of 1824, did not deal with creative works, and instead only mentioned patents:

The first legal document to deal with the protection of creative works in Brazil was the Law of 11 August 1827, which gave jurist course professors exclusive publication rights to their course's compendia for the 10 years following their approval by the government.

However, the general protection of creative works in Brazil first came from article 261 of the Criminal Code of 1830. It protected any text ("or stamp") which had been written, composed or translated by Brazilian citizens, for the lifetime of the author, plus 10 years if they had any heirs. If such works were made by corporations, the protection lasted for 10 years after publication.

While it was a step in the direction of an all-encompassing copyright protection, the Code of 1830 protected only written works, not any other kind of artwork. This and other issues would be criticized by scholars in the decades that followed its enactment.

First Republic 
Following the Proclamation of the Republic in 1889, copyright protections were expanded to encompass any type of artistic work – and no longer only literary works – in the Penal Code of 1890. The duration of copyright wasn't changed; it still lasted for the lifetime of the author, plus 10 years if they had any heirs.

In 1891, copyright would finally become constitutional, in the first constitution of the Brazilian republic. That, in itself, was a landmark in terms of Brazilian copyright protections. The law had a clear separation of patents and copyright, and delegated the duration of copyright to the Penal Code – as such, it remained as lifetime of the author, plus 10 years if there were heirs.

Current copyright terms 
For works where the author is known, copyright lasts for the lifetime of the author plus 70 years, counting from 1 January of the subsequent year after their death.

If the author is unknown or anonymous, any unpublished work is in the public domain. For published works where the author is anonymous or a pseudonym, the publishing party retains copyright for 70 years after publication, again counting from 1 January of the subsequent year. If the author is found or discovered before the work's copyright expires, it reverts to being lifetime plus 70 years.

Audiovisual works (such as films) and photographs are protected for 70 years after their publication, counting from 1 January of the subsequent year.

Apart from expired copyright and unknown authors, works in the public domain include those from authors who have died and left no successors.

Limitations 
However, copyright is not all-encompassing in Brazil – it has some limitations. The following are not considered copyright infringements:

 The reproduction of:
 News or informative articles, in periodicals, as long as the name of the original author (if there is one) and of the original publication are mentioned;
 Public speeches, in periodicals;
 Portraits or any other form of image representation, made-to-order, when reproduced by the owner, given that there is no opposition by the person represented in them or by their heirs;
 Literary, artistic or scientific works, for exclusive use by the visually impaired, as long as the reproduction is noncommercial and uses braille or other appropriated procedure;
 The nonprofit reproduction, in a single exemplar of few excerpts, for private use by the copyist, if made by themself;
 The quotation in books, newspapers, magazines or any other means of communication, of sections of any work, for the purpose of study, criticism or controversy, of a justifiable amount of content, indicating the name of the author and the source of the work;
 The collection of lecture notes in an education institution by who they are directed to, barred their publication, in whole or in part, without authorization by the lecturer;
 The use of literary, artistic or scientific works, audio recordings and radio or television transmissions in commercial establishments, exclusively for demonstration to clients, as long as these establishments commercialize support or equipments that allow for its use;
 Theatrical representation and musical execution, when done at home or for exclusively didactic reasons in education establishments, given it is not-for-profit;
 The use of literary, artistic or scientific works to produce judiciary or administrative evidence;
 The reproduction, in any work, of small sections of existing works, of any nature, or of the full work, when dealing with plastic arts, whenever the reproduction itself is not the main purpose of the new work and that it does not harm the normal exploration of the reproduced work or cause unjustifiable loss to the interests of the original authors. This can be seen as a sort of fair use equivalent.

Paraphrasing and parodying are also allowed, given that they are neither faithful reproductions of the originating work, nor disparaging to it. Additionally, Brazilian law has a freedom of panorama clause, concerning permanently displayed works in the public space. It allows for their reproduction through paintings, drawings, photographs and "audiovisual procedures".

Fair dealing 
Brazilian copyright law does not refer to its self-imposed limitations as "fair dealing" (or "fair use"), although some of them – such as the right to quote – could be considered as such. That said, the law has a specific clause preventing what is most commonly referred to, usually in online spaces, as "fair use":

Notes

References

Bibliography

External links 
 Portal Domínio Público – Government's public domain portal
 Brasiliana Fotográfica – Portal for the National Library's photographic collection, 

Brazil
Brazilian intellectual property law